The Last Straw is a 1920 American silent Western film directed by Denison Clift and Charles Swickard and starring Buck Jones, Vivian Rich, and Jane Talent. It cost $31,000 to make, considerably exceeding its planned budget. It was Jones' first starring role.

Plot
As described in a film magazine, Tom Beck (Jones) is one of the cowboys on the H O ranch in Montana who does not believe in taking a chance. On the arrival of Jane Hunter (Rich), a young New York woman who has inherited the property from her uncle, at the ranch she watches as four men draw straws to see who will be the ranch foreman. Tom refuses to take a chance on drawing the last straw and loses the job as it was the short one. Hepburn (Le Moyne), whom Tom suspects of conniving with cattle rustlers in their attempt to gain part of the H O ranch, is made foreman. Tom, however, becomes Jane's confidant. His refusal to let her drink and smoke, which she had been accustomed to do in New York, wins her admiration. Dick Hilton (Kenny), an insipid New York millionaire who Jane had refused to marry after becoming financially dependent, follows her to Montana. He scorns at her praise of Tom, and when Jane refuses to tolerate his amours, he attempts to force them upon her. Tom intervenes and throws Dick from the house. Dick then turns his attentions on Bobby (Talent), the daughter of the squatter Alf Cole who is the tool of the rustlers. Hepburn then resigns as foreman and Tom is given charge. He scents trouble from this action and informs Jane that he is going to the rustlers' cabin to make settlement. Jane gives him a locket for good luck, informing Tom that he is not to open it. At the cabin of the rustlers Dick attempts to kill Tom and in the shooting affray Tom manages to escape only to be captured by another of his enemies. While he is absent from the ranch, the other men capture the squatter Alf, and he is put on trial with Jane acting as judge. She acquits him, an act which touches the heart of Bobby, who had been angered by the relations between Jane and Dick. After escaping from the ropes used to bind him, Tom arrives at the H O ranch in time to join in another shooting affray. He is taking Jane to a safe place when Dick sneaks up from the back to kill him. Bobby, despite her love for Dick, sees this and shoots him. Tom and Jane return to a cabin and Tom, after Jane reveals the content of the locket as being the last straw, says that he is now ready to take a chance.

Cast
 Buck Jones as Tom Beck  
 Vivian Rich as Jane Hunter  
 Jane Talent as Bobby Cole  
 Colin Kenny as Dick Hilton  
 Charles Le Moyne as Hepburn  
 James Robert Chandler as Alf Cole  
 William Gillis as Two Bits  
 Slim Padgett as Sam McKee  
 Hank Bell as Pat Webb  
 Zeib Morris as Riley  
 Lon Poff as Rev. Beal

References

Bibliography
 Solomon, Aubrey. The Fox Film Corporation, 1915-1935. A History and Filmography. McFarland & Co, 2011.

External links

 

1920 films
1920 Western (genre) films
American black-and-white films
Films directed by Denison Clift
Films directed by Charles Swickard
Fox Film films
Squatting in film
Silent American Western (genre) films
1920s English-language films
1920s American films